The year 1629 in music involved some significant events.

Events
Gregorio Allegri is appointed to compose for the Sistine Chapel.
The wooden opera house of Teatro San Cassiano in Venice burns down.

Classical music
Antonio Cifra
Motets and psalms for twelve voices (Venice: Alessandro Vincenti)
Motets and psalms for eight voices (Venice: Bartolomeo Magni for Gardano)
Motets for two, three, four, six, and eight voices (Venice: Bartolomeo Magni for Gardano)
Scipione Dentice –  for five voices (Naples: Lazaro Scoriggio)
Melchior Franck
 for four voices (Coburg: Johann Forckel), a setting of Isaiah 53
 (Coburg: Johann Forckel), a collection of motets
 for six voices (Coburg: Johann Forckel), a wedding motet setting Song of Songs 4
 for six voices (Coburg: Kaspar Bertsch), a wedding motet
 for five voices (Coburg: Kaspar Bertsch), a birthday motet
 for five voices (Coburg: Johann Forckel)
Biagio Marini – , Op. 8
Carlo Milanuzzi – First book of Masses  for seven and eleven voices with four instruments and basso continuo, Op. 16 (Venice: Alessandro Vincenti)
Asprilio Pacelli -  (Venice, Alessandro Vicentini) published posthumously
Heinrich Schütz – , part 1, published in Venice

Opera
Giovanni Rovetta –

Births 
January 13 – Lelio Colista, Italian composer and lutenist (died 1680)
April 1 – Jean-Henri d'Anglebert, composer and harpsichordist (died 1691)
Baptized September 3 – Lady Mary Dering, composer (died 1704)

Deaths
January 27 – Hieronymus Praetorius, composer and organist (born 1560)
April 19 – Sigismondo d'India, Italian composer (born c.1582)
May 5 – Joachim Burmeister, German composer and music theorist (born 1564)
October 2 – Antonio Cifra, Baroque composer (born 1584)
date unknown
Paolo Agostino, composer and organist (born c.1583)
Gaspar Fernandes, organist and composer (born 1566)

References

 
Music
17th century in music
Music by year